Laura Marie Rafferty (born 29 April 1996) is a Northern Irish professional footballer who plays as a defender for Southampton in the FA Women's Championship and the Northern Ireland national team. She previously played for Chelsea L.F.C.

Early life
Rafferty began playing football for a local team at the age of eight. After scoring 50 goals in 8 games, she reported being "chucked out of the league." She played for eight years with the Southampton F.C. Academy  as well as the Hampshire Centre of Excellence before moving to Chelsea L.F.C.

Club career 
Rafferty started her senior career in 2014 at Chelsea F.C. Women.  She spent part of 2016 on loan at Oxford United. After three seasons with Chelsea F.C. Women with limited game time, Rafferty signed with Brighton & Hove Albion in the FA WSL 2 in January 2017 for the 2017 Spring Series.  The team has since moved up to England's top flight, the FA WSL.

In September 2020 Rafferty joined Bristol City on loan for the 2020–21 season. Bristol finished bottom of the WSL table and were relegated to the FA Women's Championship.

On 5 July 2021 Rafferty joined third-tier, Southampton after being released by Brighton. Saints were promoted in the 2021–22 season to the FA Women's Championship, Tier 2 of the English football pyramid.

International career 
Rafferty made her debut for the Northern Ireland national team on 6 March 2013 in a match against the Republic of Ireland.

References

External links

 
 
 FAWNL stats
 

1996 births
Living people
Women's Super League players
Chelsea F.C. Women players
Northern Ireland women's international footballers
Women's association football defenders
Women's association footballers from Northern Ireland
Brighton & Hove Albion W.F.C. players
Oxford United W.F.C. players
Footballers from Southampton
English women's footballers
English people of Northern Ireland descent
UEFA Women's Euro 2022 players
Women's Championship (England) players
Southampton F.C. Women players